Yohán Eduardo Cumana Hernández, known as Yohán Cumana (born 8 March 1996) is a Venezuelan  footballer who plays for Deportivo La Guaira in the Venezuelan Primera División.

International career
Cumana made his debut for the full Venezuela national football team in the opening fixture of the 2021 Copa América against Brazil.

References

1996 births
Living people
Venezuelan footballers
Venezuela international footballers
Association football defenders
Deportivo Anzoátegui players
Deportivo La Guaira players
Venezuelan Primera División players
2021 Copa América players
20th-century Venezuelan people
21st-century Venezuelan people